Nathan Bryan is an industrial researcher and adjunct assistant professor at the Baylor College of Medicine. He received an undergraduate degree in biochemistry from the University of Texas at Austin and a Ph.D. from Louisiana State University. He studies nitric oxide restoration in humans, and he is co-founder of HumanN, a firm developing products to increase nitric oxide levels.

Bryan has co-edited or written three books: Food, Nutrition & The Nitric Oxide Pathway, Nitrates and Nitrites in Human Health and Disease, and Blood & Tissue Nitric Oxide Products.

References

Living people
21st-century American biologists
University of Texas faculty
Date of birth missing (living people)
1973 births
Baylor College of Medicine faculty